Vadym Panas (born 23 May 1985) is a retired professional Ukrainian football midfielder.

External links
Profile on Football Squads

1985 births
Living people
Ukrainian footballers
Association football midfielders
Ukrainian Premier League players
Ukrainian expatriate footballers
Expatriate footballers in Belarus
FC Volyn Lutsk players
FC Kovel-Volyn Kovel players
FC Ikva Mlyniv players
FC Polissya Zhytomyr players
FC Zorya Luhansk players
FC Karpaty Lviv players
FC Lviv players
FC Obolon-Brovar Kyiv players
FC Naftan Novopolotsk players
FC Nyva Ternopil players
FC ODEK Orzhiv players
Sportspeople from Volyn Oblast